†Lamellidea nakadai was a species of air-breathing tropical land snails, terrestrial pulmonate gastropod mollusks in the family Achatinellidae. This species was endemic to Japan; it is now extinct.

References

Lamellidea
Extinct gastropods
Taxonomy articles created by Polbot